Kiss: Animalize Live Uncensored is a live video by the American rock band Kiss recorded at Detroit Cobo Hall on December 8, 1984, during Kiss's Animalize World Tour. It was originally aired on MTV. The tour featured perhaps the most varied setlist Kiss has ever played, featuring songs from seven of the band's studio releases up to that point. Three songs from Animalize were played, and many of the band's more popular songs were performed. The show was filmed on the same day temporary guitarist Bruce Kulick was named an official member, replacing Mark St. John. As suggested by its title, Animalize Live Uncensored features plenty of profane onstage banter from singer/guitarist Paul Stanley, that would make even a sailor blush.

The concert has yet to be officially released on DVD. The only DVD version available is a Brazilian-produced bootleg ripped from a Japanese laserdisc.

Track listing

Personnel
Paul Stanley – lead and backing vocals, rhythm guitar
Gene Simmons – lead and backing vocals, bass guitar
Eric Carr – drums, backing vocals, lead vocals on "Young and Wasted" and "Black Diamond"
Bruce Kulick – lead guitar, backing vocals on "I Love It Loud"

Certifications

References

Kiss (band) video albums
1985 video albums
Live video albums
1985 live albums